Iron County School District is a school district in Cedar City, Utah.

The first school in Iron County was dedicated on December 23, 1851 in Parowan, Utah. In 1853, school was also held in Cedar City at the Old Fort. In 1856, the first school in Cedar city was built. Today, Iron County School District has eight secondary schools, nine elementary schools, and two preschools. It has a total enrollment of approximately 8,900 students.

Schools

 High schools:
 Canyon View High School, Cedar City website
 Cedar High School, Cedar City website
 Parowan High School, Parowan website
 Southwest Education Academy website
 Launch High School website
 Middle schools:
 Canyon View Middle School, Cedar City website
 Cedar Middle School, Cedar City website
 Elementary schools:
 East Elementary website
 Enoch Elementary website
 Escalante Valley Elementary website
 Fiddlers Canyon Elementary website
 Iron Springs Elementary website
 North Elementary website
 Parowan Elementary website
 South Elementary website
 Three Peaks Elementary website
 Other schools:
 Gateway Preparatory Academy (not part of Iron County School District), Enoch City website
 Preschool website
 SUCCESS Academy, Cedar City website

School board
The school district is managed by a five-member school board, one from each of the five component districts.

See also

 List of school districts in Utah

References

External links

 

School districts in Utah
Education in Iron County, Utah
School districts established in 1853
1853 establishments in Utah Territory